Sacred Heart Church is a former Roman Catholic parish church under the authority of the Roman Catholic Archdiocese of New York, located in Hankins, Sullivan County, New York. The parish was established in 1919 and is now closed.

References 

Christian organizations established in 1919
Closed churches in the Roman Catholic Archdiocese of New York
Closed churches in New York (state)
Roman Catholic churches in New York (state)
Churches in Sullivan County, New York